Tournaments for the Diplomacy board game have been conducted around the world for decades.

WorldDipCon 
During the 1970s, there were very few Diplomacy tournaments outside North America. At that time, the winner of the tournament held at American DipCon was considered by the North American players as a world champion of Diplomacy.

The WorldDipCon (World Diplomacy Convention) was created in 1988 and the winner of the tournament held at this convention becomes the world champion of Diplomacy.

The players taking the top three places in each WorldDipCon tournament are listed below:

The 2020 event was originally scheduled for Dover, USA, but was postponed due to the COVID-19 pandemic. Both the already-selected 2020 (Dover) and 2021 (Bangkok) events were pushed back two years.

Online Diplomacy Championship 

Created in 2015, the Online Diplomacy Championship occurs once every two years, rotating between a number of Diplomacy websites. The winner is considered to be the World Champion of Online Diplomacy, a format in which phases are processed once every one or two days, and all correspondence is sent in written form via the host site. Players in online tournaments typically play under pseudonyms, and accept the title under these names.

The players taking the top three places in each ODC tournament are listed below.

North America

DipCon 

The winner of the DipCon (Diplomacy Convention) tournament is the North American champion. The title of North American champion was not given at the beginning, but since 1972 has been awarded to each winner of the convention tournament. DipCon was created in 1966 and occurred each year (except in 1967 and 1968). There was no tournament in 1966, 1969 and 1971.

The winner of each DipCon North American Championship tournament:

North American Grand Prix 

The winner of each Grand Prix:

Europe

EuroDipCon 

The winner of each EuroDipCon tournament:

European Grand Prix 

The winner of each Grand Prix:

Australia and New Zealand

Bismark Cup 

The National Tournaments Championship – comprising the perpetual trophy known as the Bismark Cup – is awarded for the best aggregate tournament results at Diplomacy tournaments held during the calendar year. It is an annual (short term) ranking. The exact number of points depends on the size of the tournament and the person's placing in that tournament.

The winner of each Bismark Cup:

Origins of the Bismark Cup 

In the early 1980s the Diplomacy scene in Australia was built around several PBM Diplomacy magazines, of which the most significant titles were Rumplestiltskin, The Go Between, Beowulf, Victoriana, The Journal of Australian Diplomacy, and The Envoy. Most of the tournament players were subscribers, players and editors of these magazines. The Envoy, which was published between 1986 and 1991, ran a series of articles which were both popular and influential. Purportedly written by Arthur von Bismark and styled as lecture transcripts, the character of Arthur von Bismark became celebrated among the contemporary Diplomacy subculture in Australia.

The articles were popular at a time when tournament play in Australia had become more organized, with well-attended tournaments in Adelaide, Canberra, Melbourne and Sydney. Rating systems at the time were being hotly debated and many players desired a way to assess the best player in the tournament scene for a calendar year, as a way of overcoming the perceived inconsistencies of rating systems within one event. The annual trophy concept was accepted among the then-principle organizers of these tournaments and the title Arthur Bismark Cup was suggested by The Envoy's then-editor Mathew Gibson.

The real author of these Arthur von Bismark articles was never announced publicly, but was suspected as being either Harry Kolotas, Marion Ashworth, Neil Ashworth or Luke Clutterbuck.

Diplomacy World Cup

The Diplomacy World Cup is a team-based tournament in Online Diplomacy, a format in which phases are processed once every one or two days, and all correspondence is sent in written form via the host site. Players in online tournaments often play under pseudonyms, and accept the title under these names.

Two different tournaments, the Diplomacy National World Cup and the webDiplomacy World Cup, are grouped together in this category. The Diplomacy National World Cup only ran twice, once in 2007 and once in 2010. The webDiplomacy World Cup had its first iteration in 2010, and runs once every two years, with the exception of 2014 as the 2012 World Cup was still ongoing. WebDiplomacy World Cup teams are not country-specific, and can instead be from regions.

See also
Diplomacy
List of world championships in mind sports

Notes

External links
  The World Diplomacy Database stored all the results known of competition in face-to-face.
  The international calendar of tournaments in face-to-face.

Avalon Hill games
Diplomacy (game)
Diplomacy